John A. Smietanka (born June 28, 1941, in Chicago) was the prosecutor for Berrien County, Michigan, from 1974 to 1981, and a United States Attorney in the Western District of Michigan, appointed by Ronald Reagan, from 1981 until 1994.

Career as a U.S. attorney 

Notable cases that Smietanka handled in the U.S. Attorney's office include the disappearance of West German freight ship captain Fredrich Helling in Lake Michigan, an investigation into sales of diluted orange juice, and a major Chicago gang prosecution which fell apart amid accusations of inappropriate favors given to prosecution witnesses.  Smiteanka also worked with Michigan Attorney General Frank J. Kelley to prosecute state representative Stephen Shepich and other people connected with fraud in the Michigan House Fiscal Agency.

The United States Attorney General's office gave him an award for outstanding service in 1989 and for distinguished service in 1993, and the John Marshall Law School (Chicago) honored him as a distinguished alumnus in 1986.

Failed nomination to the Sixth Circuit 

On January 24, 1992, President George H. W. Bush nominated Smietanka to be a judge of the United States Court of Appeals for the Sixth Circuit. However, with the Democrats controlling the U.S. Senate Judiciary Committee, Smietanka's nomination languished, and it lapsed with the end of Bush's presidency.  President Bill Clinton did not renominate Smietanka to the Sixth Circuit.

Run for Attorney General 

In 1994 and 1998, Smietanka was the Republican candidate for Michigan Attorney General, but lost in both years to his opponents. In 1998 he lost to Jennifer Granholm.

Current work 

Smietanka is now in private practice as a partner in Smietanka, Buckleitner, Steffes and Gezon, a Michigan law firm. In 2005, he helped free Larry Souter, wrongfully convicted as a murderer, a case for which he was honored as Lawyer of the Year by Michigan Lawyers Weekly. He is one of the attorneys for Ibrahim Parlak, a Kurd whom the United States attempted to deport. In 2007, Smietanka was one of two lawyers chosen by John McCain to co-chair Lawyers for McCain in Michigan, a coalition of Michigan attorneys, as part of his presidential campaign. Since 2001 Smietanka has been an instructor for an annual program held by the John Marshall Law School in Luhačovice, in the Czech Republic, to educate young Czech and Slovak lawyers about the American legal system.

See also

George H.W. Bush judicial appointment controversies

References

External links
Profile of Smietanka on his law firm's web site

|-

1941 births
Living people
Lawyers from Chicago
United States Attorneys for the Western District of Michigan
Michigan Republicans
John Marshall Law School (Chicago) alumni
20th-century American lawyers